Agyneta olivacea is a species of sheet weaver found in the Holarctic. It was described by Emerton in 1882.

References

olivacea
Spiders described in 1882
Holarctic spiders